Jeroen Ketting (born 10 November 1980) is a former Dutch professional footballer who last played as a striker for PEC Zwolle in the Dutch Eredivisie. He formerly played for Haarlem, FC Volendam, SC Cambuur and Lommel United.

External links
 Voetbal International

1980 births
Living people
Footballers from Haarlem
Association football forwards
Dutch footballers
HFC Haarlem players
FC Volendam players
Lommel S.K. players
SC Cambuur players
PEC Zwolle players
Eredivisie players
Eerste Divisie players
Challenger Pro League players